Aglaomorpha coronans is a species of tropical fern widely distributed throughout Southeast Asia, from Nepal to Peninsular Malaysia. Like other Aglaomorpha, it is an epiphyte and its scientific name (coronans) refers to the circular, crown-like growth habit.

References

coronans
Ferns of Asia
Plants described in 1841